Spazigaster  is a genus of hoverflies. The genus was first recorded in 1843 in Iran.

Species
S. ambulans (Fabricius, 1798)
S. nostra Zimina, 1963

References

Diptera of Europe
Diptera of Asia
Hoverfly genera
Syrphinae
Taxa named by Camillo Rondani